Dennis Herrick (born 13 December 1952) is a Puerto Rican wrestler. He competed in the men's freestyle 74 kg at the 1976 Summer Olympics.

References

1952 births
Living people
Puerto Rican male sport wrestlers
Olympic wrestlers of Puerto Rico
Wrestlers at the 1976 Summer Olympics
Place of birth missing (living people)